Live 1990 is a 2002 live album release of two 1990 concerts by Hawkwind.

The first concert, making up CD1 and the first three tracks from CD2, was recorded on their Winter 1990 tour, 30 minutes of which had previously been issued in Italy as a CD accompanying the Never Ending Story of the Psychedelic Warlords book. The remainder is composed of the soundtrack to the filmed concert performance which is also available on the Nottingham video.

Track listing
CD1
"Karnac Intro" (Hawkwind) – 7:16
"Angels of Death" (Brock) – 4:24
"Golden Void" [listed as "Void of Golden Light"] (Brock) – 8:00
"Ejection" (Calvert) – 10:52
"Wings" (Davey) – 6:33
"Out of the Shadows" (Buckley, Brock, Davey) – 7:01
"Snake Dance" (Hawkwind) – 2:48
"Night of the Hawks" (Brock) – 5:57
"Seventh Star" (Wishart, Hawkwind) – 5:43
"T.V Suicide" (Bainbrdge) – 5:15
CD2
"Back in the Box" (Wishart, Hawkwind) – 11:46
"Hassan-i-Sabah" [listed as "Assassins Of Allah"] (Calvert, Rudolph) – 4:47
"Images" (Wishart, Brock, Davey) – 9:12
"Assault and Battery" [listed as "Lives of Great Men"] (Brock) – 3:52
"Golden Void" [listed as "Void of Golden Light"] (Brock) – 6:13
"Out of the Shadows" (Buckley, Brock, Davey) – 7:33
"Snake Dance" (Hawkwind) – 3:08
"Night of the Hawks" (Brock) – 4:45
"Seventh Star" (Wishart, Hawkwind) – 2:48
"Back in the Box" (Wishart, Hawkwind) – 6:37
"Arrival in Utopia" [listed as "Utopia"] (Moorcock, Brock) – 2:19
"Ejection" (Calvert) – 6:38
"Damnation Alley" (Calvert, Brock, House) / "Your Secret's Safe With Me" (Wishart, Hawkwind) – 8:00

Personnel
Hawkwind
Bridget Wishart – vocals
Dave Brock – guitar, keyboards, vocals
Harvey Bainbridge – keyboards, vocals
Alan Davey – bass guitar, vocals
Simon House – violin (Lenton Lane session only)
Richard Chadwick – drums

References

Hawkwind live albums
2002 live albums